Eriauchenus ratsirarsoni is a species of spider in the family Archaeidae first described by Wood and Schraff in 2018. It is endemic to Madagascar. The genus name has also been incorrectly spelt "Eriauchenius".

References 

Archaeidae
Spiders described in 2018